This is a list of all Dinner: Impossible episodes.

Episodes

Season 1

Season 2

Season 3

Season 4

Season 5

Season 6

Season 7

Season 8

Season 9

Notes

References 

 
 

Dinner Impossible